Trei Oliver (born June 9, 1976) is an American college football coach. He is the head football coach at North Carolina Central University, a position he has held since December 2018. Oliver played college football at North Carolina Central as a defensive back and punter from 1994 to 1997.

Head coaching record

References

External links
 North Carolina Central profile

1976 births
Living people
American football defensive backs
American football punters
Delaware State Hornets football coaches
Grambling State Tigers football coaches
North Carolina A&T Aggies football coaches
North Carolina Central Eagles football coaches
North Carolina Central Eagles football players
Southern Jaguars football coaches
Grambling State University alumni
People from Yorktown, Virginia
Coaches of American football from Virginia
Players of American football from Virginia
African-American coaches of American football
African-American players of American football
20th-century African-American sportspeople
21st-century African-American sportspeople